Nadezhda Alexandrovna Evstyukhina (born 27 May 1988) is a Russian weightlifter.

Career
In the 69 kg category, Evstyukhina won the silver medal at the 2005 Junior World Championships, and the gold medal at the 2006 Junior World Championships.

Evstyukhina participated in the women's -75 kg class at the 2006 World Weightlifting Championships and won the silver medal, finishing behind Cao Lei. She snatched 122 kg and clean and jerked an additional 145 kg for a total of 267 kg, 1 kg behind winner Cao.

At the 2007 World Weightlifting Championships she won the bronze medal in the 75 kg category, with a total of 278 kg.

She also initially was awarded the bronze medal in the 75 kg category at the 2008 Summer Olympics, with a total of 264 kg. She competed at the 2012 Summer Olympics, but failed to snatch the initial weight.

On 31 August 2016, the International Olympic Committee confirmed that Evstyukhina had been disqualified from the 2008 Beijing Olympic Games. Reanalysis of Evstyukhina's samples from Beijing 2008 resulted in a positive test for the prohibited substances dehydrochlormethyltestosterone (turinabol) and EPO. As a result, her results were expunged, the athlete was disqualified and her bronze medal removed. The fate of her other medals following the 2008 positive sample is to be decided by the IWF.

References

External links
 Athlete Biography at beijing2008

1988 births
Living people
Competitors stripped of Summer Olympics medals
Doping cases in weightlifting
Olympic weightlifters of Russia
Russian female weightlifters
Russian sportspeople in doping cases
Weightlifters at the 2008 Summer Olympics
Weightlifters at the 2012 Summer Olympics
World Weightlifting Championships medalists
Universiade medalists in weightlifting
Universiade silver medalists for Russia
European Weightlifting Championships medalists
Medalists at the 2013 Summer Universiade
Sportspeople from Moscow Oblast
21st-century Russian women